Ewelina Sętowska-Dryk (born 5 March 1980 in Puławy) is a Polish middle distance runner who specializes in the 800 metres.

She finished fifth at the 2005 Summer Universiade in Izmir and sixth at the 2006 IAAF World Indoor Championships in Moscow, the latter in an indoor personal best indoor time of 2:02.39 minutes. She won a bronze medal in 4 x 400 metres relay at the 2006 European Championships, together with teammates Monika Bejnar, Grażyna Prokopek and Anna Jesień.

Her personal best time over 800 m is 1:58.96 minutes, achieved in August 2006 in Rieti.

Competition record

External links
 

1980 births
Living people
Polish female middle-distance runners
People from Puławy
European Athletics Championships medalists
Universiade medalists in athletics (track and field)
Sportspeople from Lublin Voivodeship
Universiade silver medalists for Poland
Medalists at the 2005 Summer Universiade
Medalists at the 2003 Summer Universiade
20th-century Polish women
21st-century Polish women